Sixty Glorious Years is a 1938 British colour film directed by Herbert Wilcox. The film is a sequel to the 1937 film Victoria the Great.

The film is also known as Queen of Destiny in the US.

Cast 
Anna Neagle as Queen Victoria
Anton Walbrook as Prince Albert
C. Aubrey Smith as the Duke of Wellington
Walter Rilla as Prince Ernest
Charles Carson as Sir Robert Peel
Felix Aylmer as Lord Palmerston
Lewis Casson as Lord John Russell
Pamela Standish as the Princess Royal
Gordon McLeod as John Brown
Henry Hallett as Joseph Chamberlain
Wyndham Goldie as Arthur Balfour
Malcolm Keen as William Ewart Gladstone
Frederick Leister as H. H. Asquith
Derrick De Marney as Benjamin Disraeli
Joyce Bland as Florence Nightingale
Frank Cellier as Lord Derby
Harvey Braban as Lord Salisbury
Aubrey Dexter as the Prince of Wales
Robert Eddison as Lanternist Professor 
Stuart Robertson as George Edward Anson
Olaf Olsen as the Crown Prince of Prussia
Marie Wright as Maggie
Laidman Browne as Gen. Gordon
Greta Schröder as Baroness Lehzen

Critical reception
The Radio Times gave the film 3 out of five stars, calling it "old-fashioned, four-square, and very nice"; and 
TV Guide also gave the same rating, calling the film "an unnecessary, but worthwhile, sequel to the epic screen biography Victoria the Great (1937)... As was the case in Victoria the Great, Wilcox's production values are superlative, with the sets and costumes accurate reproductions of the actual items which are housed at the British Museum. The American public was so interested in both the Queen Victoria films that RKO and Wilcox formed a contract that ensured distribution of British films in the U.S. and an exchange of American and British talent for various productions. This led to husband and wife Wilcox and Neagle's next project, Nurse Edith Cavell (1939), which was produced in Hollywood."

References

External links 

1938 films
1938 drama films
1930s English-language films
1930s color films
British sequel films
Cultural depictions of Queen Victoria on film
Films directed by Herbert Wilcox
British drama films
Cultural depictions of Benjamin Disraeli
Cultural depictions of Arthur Wellesley, 1st Duke of Wellington
1930s British films